Cosmopterix schmidiella is a moth of the family Cosmopterigidae. It is found from most of Great Britain to Romania, and from Japan through central Russia to the Iberian Peninsula. It is believed to be extinct in Britain.

The wingspan is 9-9.5 mm. Adults are on wing from August to May. Then the larva hibernates outside of the mine in a hibernaculum.

The larvae feed on Lathyrus montanus, Lathyrus niger, Vicia sepium and Vicia pisiformis. They mine the leaves of their host plant. The mine has the form of a large blotch, that may occupy an entire leaflet. During feeding pauses, the larva rests in a silken resting place above the midrib. Pupation takes place outside of the mine.

Subspecies
Cosmopterix schmidiella schmidiella
Cosmopterix schmidiella mongoliella Sinev, 1979 (Mongolia)

References

schmidiella
Moths of Asia
Moths of Europe